The following lists events that happened during 2001 in Republic of Albania.

Incumbents 
 President: Rexhep Meidani
 Prime Minister: Ilir Meta

Events

January 
 Albania and Yugoslavia re-establish diplomatic relations broken off during the Kosovo crisis in 1999.

April 
 UN says thousands of Albanians are being poisoned by fatal toxins in their environment, urges international community to help.

July  
 Ruling Socialist Party secures second term in office by winning general elections. PM Meta names European integration and an end to energy shortages as his priorities. Meta heads a new coalition government from September.

December 
 Rift widens between Meta and his Socialist Party Chairman Fatos Nano. Nano prompts three ministers to resign and blocks the appointment of their replacements.

Deaths 
 10 March - Fatmir Haxhiu, Albanian painter
 22 August - Spiro Koleka, Albanian statesman, communist politician and a high-ranking military officer during World War II.

References 

 
Years of the 21st century in Albania
2000s in Albania